"Oh, vilken härlig dag" is a song written by Kenneth Gärdestad and Ted Gärdestad, and performed by the latter at Melodifestivalen 1973 where the song ended up 4th. The song was released as a single in February 1973, as well as the 1973 album Ted. The song entered Svensktoppen on 15 April 1973, reaching 10th position, before ending up knocked out of chart the upcoming week.

In July–August 2004, Jill Johnson scored a cover hit with the song, after the single was released on 30 April 2004, with an instrumental song as B-side, peaking at 37th position at the Swedish singles chart. This recording has been used in a commercial for the beer label Pripps.

Single track listing

Jill Johnson 
Oh, vilken härlig dag - 3:46
Oh, vilken härlig dag (instrumental version) - 3:45

Charts

References

External links
Information at Svensk mediedatabas

1973 songs
1973 singles
Ted Gärdestad songs
Jill Johnson songs
Melodifestivalen songs of 1973
Polar Music singles
Songs written by Ted Gärdestad
Swedish-language songs